Kendell Beckwith (born December 2, 1994) is a former American football linebacker. He played college football at Louisiana State University (LSU).

Professional career
Coming out of LSU, Beckwith was projected by the majority of NFL draft experts and scouts to be a third or fourth round draft pick. He received an invitation to the NFL combine, but was unable to perform any drills besides the bench press due to a torn ACL in his left knee that he suffered in November. On April 5, 2017, he attended LSU's pro day along with Leonard Fournette, Malachi Dupre, Jamal Adams, Ethan Pocic, Duke Riley, Tre'Davious White, and 11 other players. Beckwith was ranked the fifth-best inside linebacker prospect by NFLDraftScout.com.

The Tampa Bay Buccaneers selected Beckwith in the third round (107th overall) of the 2017 NFL Draft. On May 23, 2017, the Tampa Bay Buccaneers signed Beckwith to a four-year, $3.17 million contract that includes a signing bonus of $706,288.

He competed with Cameron Lynch, Devante Bond, and Eric Nzeocha for a job as a starting outside linebacker. Head coach Dirk Koetter named him the starting strong side linebacker to begin the regular season. He made his professional regular season debut and his first career start during the Tampa Bay Buccaneers' season-opener against the Chicago Bears and recorded five solo tackles and deflected a pass in the 29–7 home victory at Raymond James Stadium. On October 5, 2017, he recorded a season-high fourteen tackles in a 14–19 loss against the New England Patriots.

On April 12, 2018, Beckwith was in a car accident with former LSU teammate Lamin Barrow and suffered a fractured ankle which required surgery. He was placed on the reserve/non-football injury list on September 1, 2018, to start the season.

On May 10, 2019, the Buccaneers placed Beckwith on the reserve/non-football injury list for the second consecutive season, due to ongoing problems arising from the accident. He was waived with a non-football injury designation on July 28, 2020.

References

External links
LSU Tigers bio

1994 births
Living people
People from Jackson, Louisiana
Players of American football from Louisiana
American football linebackers
LSU Tigers football players
Tampa Bay Buccaneers players